Josip Škorić (born 13 February 1981 in Split) is a retired Croatian football goalkeeper who is currently a goalkeeper trainer at  NK Slaven Belupo.

Career
In 2010, Škorić joined Istra 1961 from NK Zagreb after having his contract terminated by mutual consent. Before that, he had short spells in Solin and Marsonia. After leaving Istra 1961 in May 2011, Škorić joined third-tier club Omiš in February 2012. In September 2012, Škorić joined Šibenik.

References

External links

1981 births
Living people
Footballers from Split, Croatia
Association football goalkeepers
Croatian footballers
Croatia youth international footballers
NK Solin players
NK Marsonia players
NK Zagreb players
NK Istra 1961 players
HNK Šibenik players
TSW Pegasus FC players
Croatian Football League players
Hong Kong First Division League players
Croatian expatriate footballers
Expatriate footballers in Hong Kong
Croatian expatriate sportspeople in Hong Kong